Amin Motevaselzadeh (also spelled Motevasel Zadeh) (born May 14, 1982) is a retired Iranian football striker.

Club career
He joined Bargh Shiraz at age of 18 and played seven years before moving to Admira Wacker.

Motevaselzadeh signed for VfB Admira Wacker Mödling on August 1, 2006, on a one-year deal that ran until May 30, 2007. Then he joined Pegah Gilan in Iran's Premier Football League.
Motevaselzadeh scored in the last minute against his former club Bargh in the semifinals of The  Hazfi Cup to take Pegah to the final for first time in which they finished second.

Fair Player of the Year
He is very well known for his amazing fair play against Steel Azin on 28 January  2010. The match was between Moghamvemat and Steel Azin in round 25 of  Iran Pro League.
Moghamvemat was coming to the game desperately needing three points as they had gathered just two points from their last six matches.
Steel Azin keeper Hamid Neshatjoo put his body on the line when he rushed out of his area and took a blow to the head to deny the host a goal scoring opportunity. The ball then fell into the path of Motevaselzadeh but rather than strike the ball into the unguarded net, the number 27 compassionately and deliberately kicked the ball into touch. Moghamvemat lost the game 2–1 and eventually was relegated on goal difference at end of the season .
He was awarded the fair play player of the year 2010 in Iran Pro League. One year later, on 28 January 2011, Motevasselzadeh won The Act of Fair Play Award, along with Darius Draudvila, a Lithuanian decathlete, and Chinese wrestler Gao Feng.

Club career statistics

References

External links
 Fan site

Iranian footballers
Association football forwards
Persian Gulf Pro League players
Azadegan League players
Bargh Shiraz players
Fajr Sepasi players
Iranian expatriate footballers
Pegah Gilan players
People from Kazerun
1982 births
Living people
FC Admira Wacker Mödling players
Austrian Football Bundesliga players
Rah Ahan players
Foolad FC players
PAS Hamedan F.C. players
Damash Gilan players
Expatriate footballers in Austria
Sportspeople from Fars province